Dafni ( meaning laurel) is a village and a community in the municipal unit of Valtetsi, Arcadia, Greece. In 2011 Dafni had a population of 48 for the village and 79 for the community, which includes the village Maniatis. Dafni is situated in a plain at the northeastern foot of the Tsemperou mountain.

Population

See also
List of settlements in Arcadia

References

External links
History and information about Dafni
 Dafni on the GTP Travel Pages

Valtetsi
Populated places in Arcadia, Peloponnese